Alceu Amoroso Lima (Petrópolis, December 11, 1893 – Rio de Janeiro, August 14, 1983) was a writer, journalist, activist from Brazil, and founder of the Brazilian Christian Democracy.  He adopted the pseudonym Tristão de Ataíde in 1919. In 1928 he converted to Catholicism and eventually became head of Catholic Action in Brazil. Although he initially had some sympathy for certain aims of Brazilian integralism he became a strong opponent of authoritarianism in general and Fascism in particular. That came in part through the influence of Jacques Maritain. He was a staunch advocate for press freedom during the period of military dictatorship.

Biography
Born into a middle-class family in Rio, Alceu Amoroso Lima was "atheist and Jacobin" studying at college Pedro II, obtaining a law degree in 1913. Influenced by positivism, he traveled to Paris, but the shock of the First World War led him to get away from it, under the influence of Jackson de Figueiredo, G. K. Chesterton and Jacques Maritain. After a dispute with the converted Jackson de Figueiredo, in favor of a "intransigent Catholicism" (with modernism), Lima converted to Catholicism in 1928, that event recounted in Adeus à disponibilidade e outros adeuses (1968). The same year he became leader of Dom Vital Center, founded by Figueiredo and broadcast anti-communist and anti-liberal anti-modernist ideas. He made his literary criticism under the pseudonym of Tristão de Ataíde, he was also manager of the company Cometa, inherited from his father. He married Maria Teresa de Faria, the daughter of the writer Alberto de Faria. He was secretary of the Catholic Electoral League, created by the Cardinal Archbishop of Rio Sebastião Leme da Silveira Cintra to act in the political sphere (without a party) with the approach of elections in 1933. Lima also chaired the National Junta of Catholic Action, founded in 1935, until 1945, and founded the Catholic Institute of Advanced Studies in 1932 and the Universidade Santa Úrsula (private) in Rio in 1937.  He went in 1935 to the Academia Brasileira de Letras, obtained in 1964 the Juca Pato Prize and Jabuti Literature Prize in 1979.  In 1930 Amoroso Lima was close to Brazilian Integralism, the fascist movement of Plínio Salgado; he parted under the influence of Jacques Maritain, with whom he corresponded. He, then, made statements tinted with Antisemitism. Alceu Lima was one of the founders of the Christian Democrat Organization of America (ODCA) in 1947, alongside, among others, the future Chilean President Eduardo Frei Montalva.  One of the representatives of Brazil at the Second Vatican Council, with the Archbishop Hélder Câmara, he was one of the founders of the Brazilian Christian Democracy. From 1967 to 1972 he was a member of the Pontifical Council for Justice and Peace.  He was professor of Sociology at the Normal school of Rio, of Political economy at the Faculty of Law and Brazilian literature at the University of Brazil and the Pontifical Catholic University of Rio de Janeiro, then rector of the University of the Federal District and president of the Center Dom Vital between 1928 and 1968. He was also a member of the Conselho Nacional de Educação. Lima lived in France, lectured on "Brazilian civilization" to the Sorbonne, and in the United States in the early 1950s. Under the Brazilian military government (1964–85), he strongly criticized censorship.

Works
 Estudos — Segunda série (1927)
 Política (1932)
 Idade, sexo e tempo (1938)
 Elementos de ação católica (1938)
 Mitos de nosso tempo (1943)
 O problema do trabalho (1946)
 Meditações sobre o mundo interior (1953)
 O existencialismo e outros mitos de nosso tempo (1951)
 O gigantismo econômico (1962)
 O humanismo ameaçado (1965)
 Os direitos do homem e o homem sem direitos (1975)
 Revolução Suicida (1977) 
 Tudo é mistério (1983)

References

External links
 .
Alceu Amoroso Lima recorded at the Library of Congress for the Hispanic Division’s audio literary archive on Oct. 10, 1976

Brazilian literary critics
Brazilian essayists
Brazilian journalists
Brazilian Roman Catholics
Converts to Roman Catholicism from atheism or agnosticism
1893 births
1983 deaths
People from Petrópolis
Maria Moors Cabot Prize winners
Academic staff of the Pontifical Catholic University of Rio de Janeiro
20th-century essayists
20th-century journalists